Mount Carmel – Blytheswood Public School is an elementary school in the north end of Leamington, Ontario, Canada. It is part of the Greater Essex County District School Board and serves students from JK to Grade 8 from the communities of Blytheswood and Mount Carmel and surrounding areas. The amalgamated Mount Carmel-Blytheswood Public School first operated in the academic year 2002–2003 with the opening of an addition, completed in the fall of 2002, which more than doubled the size of the school.

Enrollment is 302 students. The majority speak English, and 30% are from Mexican-Mennonite backgrounds who speak Low German at home.

A Learning Support Program, computer lab and resource library assist teachers in meeting the curricular needs of all students. Co-curricular and extra-curricular activities including school teams, house league programs and various clubs.

References

External links
Official web site

Elementary schools in Ontario
Leamington, Ontario
Schools in Essex County, Ontario